In mathematics, the quotient of subspace theorem is an important property of finite-dimensional normed spaces, discovered by Vitali Milman.

Let (X, ||·||) be an N-dimensional normed space. There exist subspaces Z ⊂ Y ⊂ X such that the following holds:
 The quotient space E = Y / Z is of dimension dim E ≥ c N, where c > 0 is a universal constant.
 The induced norm || · || on E, defined by

 

is uniformly isomorphic to Euclidean. That is, there exists a positive quadratic form ("Euclidean structure") Q on E, such that

  for 

with K > 1 a universal constant. 

The statement is relative easy to prove by induction on the dimension of Z (even for Y=Z, X=0, c=1) with a K that depends only on N; the point of the theorem is that K is independent of N.

In fact, the constant c can be made arbitrarily close to 1, at the expense of the
constant K becoming large. The original proof allowed

Notes

References 
 
 
 

Banach spaces
Asymptotic geometric analysis
Theorems in functional analysis